An election to Reading Borough Council took place as of 5 May 2022. Following boundary changes all the seats on the council were up for election.

Previous council composition 

Changes:
 January 2022: Chris Maskell leaves Labour to sit as an independent, David Stevens leaves Conservatives for Labour

Results

Ward results
The Notice of Poll and Statement of Persons Nominated was published on 6 April 2022. The results were published on 6 May.

Abbey

Battle

Caversham

Caversham Heights

Church

Coley

Emmer Green

Katesgrove

Kentwood

Norcot

Park

Redlands

Southcote

Thames

Tilehurst

Whitley

References

2022
2020s in Berkshire
2022 English local elections